Virginia Ramírez Merino (born 22 May 1964 in Madrid) is a former field hockey player from Spain. She was a member of the Women's National Team that won the gold medal at the 1992 Summer Olympics on home soil (Barcelona).

Notes

References

External links
 
 
 
 

1964 births
Field hockey players at the 1992 Summer Olympics
Living people
Olympic field hockey players of Spain
Olympic gold medalists for Spain
Field hockey players from Madrid
Spanish female field hockey players
Olympic medalists in field hockey
Medalists at the 1992 Summer Olympics
20th-century Spanish women